Championship Manager 2009 Express is the iOS version of Eidos Interactive's best-selling football management PC title, developed by Dundee-based, BAFTA award-winning mobile games developer Dynamo Games.

Premise
The Championship Manager series lets players assume managerial control over their favourite football club in a bid for both league and tournament victory. The series has always featured real-life clubs and players adding a degree of authenticity to how well certain teams and players perform.

Features

As with each new entry into the heldheld series developed by Dynamo Games, Championship Manager 2009 Express expands both the managerial options available to the player and new aesthetic qualities, allowing better ease of control and menu navigation.

Individual player training is new to this version and allows users to focus specific training routines on key players to give them a competitive edge in crucial matches, while past installments offered full-team routines only.

Like past entries to the series, matches play out in 2D on-screen and can be sped up or slowed down to suit the player's preference. This version allows users to view matches in real-time and change tactics or make substitutions at any time if they feel their current strategies are not working.

Board members will influence investment into the player's chosen club. Managers can set themselves targets throughout each season that will affect the level of funds provided by the board.

Full promotion and relegation means that managers can be completely relegated out of their chosen league and dropped into the non-leagues or, if the board decides, sacked from their team.

Press conferences take players to task for their actions if performance is poor. Users may be put on the spot and asked to explain their managerial decisions.

External links
 Official Website
 Launch Announcement
 Official Championship Manager Homepage

References

2009 video games
IPod games
IOS games
IOS-only games
Association football management video games
Video games developed in the United Kingdom